Route 470, also known as La Poile Highway, is a highway on the West Coast of the Canadian province of Newfoundland and Labrador. It is the last provincial highway off Route 1 before approaching the Marine Atlantic Ferry to Nova Scotia, in Channel-Port aux Basques. During much of the journey, there is plenty of barren land on both sides of the road, until arriving at its final community, Rose Blanche. Route 470 also carries the designation of Granite Coast Scenic Drive.

Route description

Route 470 begins at an interchange with Route 1 (Trans-Canada Highway, Exit 1) just north of the Marine Atlantic ferry docks in Channel-Port aux Basques. The highway winds its way through rural hilly terrain for several kilometres, where it meets a local road leading to Margaree and Fox Roost, as well as crosses the Isle aux Morts River, before passing through Isle aux Morts. Route 470 winds its way eastward along the Atlantic coastline for several kilometres to pass through Burnt Islands and meet a local road leading to Diamond Cove before entering the town of Rose Blanche-Harbour le Cou. The highway now crosses another river and passes by the La Poile ferry docks before becoming Main Street and having and intersection with a local road leading to the Harbour le Cou portion of town. Route 470 enters the Rose Blanche portion of town to pass through neighbourhoods, where it meets a road leading to the Lighthouse, before passing through downtown and coming to a dead end at the southern tip of a long, skinny, peninsula.

Major intersections

References

470